XEJMN-AM (La Voz de los Cuatro Pueblos – "The Voice of the Four Peoples") is an indigenous community radio station that broadcasts in Spanish, Cora, Huichol, Southeastern Tepehuán and Nahuatl from Jesús María, municipality of El Nayar, in the Mexican state of Nayarit. It is run by the Cultural Indigenist Broadcasting System (SRCI) of the National Institute of Indigenous Peoples (INPI).

External links
XEJMN website
FCC information for XEJMN
Radio Locator information for XEJMN

References

Sistema de Radiodifusoras Culturales Indígenas
Cora-language radio stations
Huichol-language radio stations
Nahuatl-language radio stations
Tepehuán-language radio stations
Radio stations in Nayarit
Radio stations established in 1992
Daytime-only radio stations in Mexico